Lalela Lali Mswane (born 27 March 1997) is a South African model and beauty queen who was crowned Miss Supranational 2022. She was previously crowned Miss South Africa 2021 and represented South Africa at Miss Universe 2021, placing second runner up.

Early life and education
Mswane was born in Richards Bay, in the KwaZulu-Natal province of South Africa. Her father, Muntu Mswane, was an Eswatini-born former diplomat and minister who died in 2010, while her mother Hleliselwe worked as an accounts clerk and homemaker. She is the youngest of three children, having an elder brother and sister. After completing her secondary education at Pro Arte Alphen Park in 2015, Mswane enrolled in the University of Pretoria, later graduating with a Bachelor of Laws degree.

Prior to becoming Miss South Africa, Mswane worked as a professional model signed to the South African modeling agency Alushi Models.

Pageantry
Mswane began her pageantry career after participating in the Matric Experience 2015 pageant, where she finished as the first runner-up.

Miss South Africa 2021
On 6 July 2021, Mswane was announced as one of the 30 women shortlisted for the Miss South Africa 2021 competition. Following a further series of interviews and public voting, she was announced on 3 August as one of the ten semifinalists who advanced to the televised finale.

The finals of Miss South Africa 2021 were held on 16 October, at Grand West Arena in Cape Town. After participating in the swimsuit and evening gown portions of the competition, Mswane advanced as a member of the top five. She later competed in the question and answer round, and was selected as one of the three finalists, before being crowned as Miss South Africa 2021. As Miss South Africa, Mswane received an array of prizes and rewards, including R1 million, a one-year residence in a fully furnished apartment in Sandton, a one-year lease on a Mercedes-Benz C-Class, and the opportunity to represent South Africa at Miss Universe 2021.

Miss Universe 2021
Mswane received widespread criticism within South Africa for agreeing to compete in Miss Universe 2021, which was set to be held in Israel, due to the Israeli–Palestinian conflict. Despite the criticism, the official Instagram account for Miss South Africa confirmed in a post with comments disabled, that Mswane would still be competing. On 14 November 2021, the government of South Africa withdrew its support to Mswane to compete at Miss Universe 2021. On 27 November, Mswane posted on her Instagram account that she had decided to participate in Miss Universe after weeks of absence. On 13 December 2021, Mswane competed at Miss Universe 2021 and placed as the second runner-up.

Miss Supranational 2022
On 15 February 2022, the Miss SA Organization announced that Mswane was appointed to represent South Africa at the 13th edition of Miss Supranational few months after competing at Miss Universe. The announcement received both positive and negative criticisms online. 

During the pageant's preliminary activities, she became a part of the Top 10 at Supra Fan Vote, Top 22 at Supra Influencer, and Top 11 at Supra Model of the Year. At the pageant, she passed all rounds of competition, eventually landing her at Top 5 with Venezuela, Thailand, Indonesia, and Vietnam. At the end of the competition, she was eventually crowned as Miss Supranational 2022, becoming the first black woman and South African to win the title. Her victory also marked a back-to-back win for Africa.

In her capacity as Miss Supranational, she travelled to Poland, Dominican Republic, Vietnam, Dubai, Curacao and South Africa.

References

External links

1997 births
Living people
Miss South Africa winners
Miss Universe 2021 contestants
Miss Supranational winners
South African beauty pageant winners
South African female models
South African people of Swazi descent
People from Richards Bay
University of Pretoria alumni
Zulu people